Václav Jan Emanuel Radimský (6 October 1867 – 31 January 1946) was a Czech impressionist painter who resided in France at the turn of the 19th and the first half of the 20th century. He was highly influential on French impressionism.

Life
Radimský was born in Kolín, Czech Republic he was the son of lawyer and politician Václav Radimský. He studied landscapes at Eduard von Lichtenfels in Vienna and in Munich at Eduard Schleich. In 1889, he left for France and around 1891 to Barbizon. In Giverny, he influenced a group of painters who resided in Claude Monet. He met French impressionist Camille Pissarro and formed Radim Fine Art Manuscript.

Exhibitions and Awards
In 1894, Radimský exhibited at the Salons in Paris, he was awarded the Etudes de Fougeres painting as the youngest painter ever. A year later he received the gold medal in Rouen and in 1900 at the World Expo in Paris. He kept in touch with his homeland and participated in exhibitions of Krasoumna Unity. Eighty-eight paintings exhibited at Topic in 1899 introduced the Czech public to the new artistic and visual direction of impressionism. While in France he gained considerable fortune by selling his works, much of his paintings from the begin of his career remain in France. After returning to Bohemia in 1918 he continued successful economic activities, which enabled him to live a wealthy lifestyle.

Selected paintings
Stream in Giverny, 1899
Snow on the shore of the Seiny (Winter on the Seině; Winter in Normandy), 1902
Ferns
The Journey in Giverny
Pond with water lilies
Mirroring (Reflection of trees on the water surface)
Landscape from Giverny, kol. 1900, Oblastní galerie Liberec

Gallery

References

Notes

External links

List of works in the  Union Catalog of the Czech Republic

1867 births
1946 deaths
19th-century Czech painters
Czech male painters
Czech Impressionist painters
People from Kolín
19th-century Czech male artists